Crystalyne Curley is an American politician serving as a delegate on the Navajo Nation Council. In January 2023, she was elected its speaker, becoming the first woman to hold the position. Curley was Miss Navajo from 2011 to 2012.

Life 
Curley is from Fish Point, Arizona. She is Tsénjíkiní and born for Tó’aheedlíinii. Her maternal grandfather is Kinyaa’áanii, and her paternal grandfather is Dził T’aadi Kinyaa’áanii. Curley graduated with two bachelor's degrees from the Arizona State University. She earned a master's in health administration from the University of New Mexico.

Curley was Miss Navajo from 2011 to 2012. She ran for the Navajo Nation Council in 2015. Curley worked in the Navajo Nation Speaker's Office. She later served as the senior public information officer for Navajo Nation President, Jonathan Nez.

In November 2022, Curley was elected delegate after defeating incumbent Kee Allen Begay. She is the first woman to represent the Tselani/Cottonwood, Nazlini, Blue Gap/Tachee, Low Mountain, and Many Farms communities on the Navajo Nation Council. In January 2023, the council elected Curley as its speaker, making her the first woman to hold the position and the first fluent Navajo speaker in the role since Johnny Naize's resignation in 2014.

References 

Living people
Year of birth missing (living people)
Place of birth missing (living people)
Speakers of the Navajo Nation Council
21st-century American women politicians
21st-century Native American politicians
21st-century Native American women
Arizona State University alumni
University of New Mexico alumni
Women in Arizona politics
21st-century American politicians